Pugliese is an Italian surname meaning "from Puglia". It may refer to:

 Aaron Pugliese, American writer
 Antonio Pugliese, professional wrestler (aka Tony Parisi)
 Clemente Pugliese Levi (1855-1936), Italian painter
 Dina Pugliese, Canadian television personality
 Frank Pugliese, TV writer and artistic director
 Giuseppe Pugliese (born 1983), Italian footballer
 Humbert Pugliese (1884–1955), Australian film exhibitor and producer
 Jim Pugliese (born 1952), American percussionist
 Julia Jones-Pugliese (1909–1993), American national champion fencer and coach
 Marcelo Pugliese (born 1968), Argentine discus thrower.
 Mario Pugliese (born 1996), Italian footballer 
 Nick Pugliese (born 1985), professional baseball pitcher
 Oronzo Pugliese (1910 - 1990), Italian football manager
 Osvaldo Pugliese (1905 – 1995), Argentine tango musician
 Patri J. Pugliese, American historian of science, dance, and fencing
 Rocco Pugliese, lobbyist in Pennsylvania
 Rose Pugliese, Colorado politician
 Joseph Pugliese (aka Joe Pug), American musician

See also
 Pugliese (disambiguation)

Italian-language surnames
Italian toponymic surnames
Ethnonymic surnames